Pedrinho was a Brazilian football manager that coached Brazil for some games in 1957.

References

Brazil national football team managers
Brazilian football managers
Place of birth missing (living people)
Year of birth missing (living people)
Living people
20th-century Brazilian people